PCNHS may refer to:
Pacita Complex National High School, school in San Pedro, Laguna, Philippines
Pasay City North High School, school in Pasay, Philippines
Pines City National High School, school in Baguio, Philippines